Nepeta govaniana is a species of herbaceous flowering plant of the genus Nepeta. It was described in 1834. A common name for the species, Himalayan catnip, may also refer to Nepeta clarkei.

References

govaniana
Species described in 1834